Rudi Vogt (born 30 January 1983) is a former South African rugby union footballer, who played as a full-back, fly-half and wing. He also made five Super Rugby appearances for the  during the 2008 Super 14 season and played for the Emerging Springboks at the 2008 IRB Nations Cup.

References

Living people
1983 births
South African rugby union players
Rugby union fullbacks
Sportspeople from Paarl
Griquas (rugby union) players
Lions (United Rugby Championship) players
Pumas (Currie Cup) players
Oyonnax Rugby players
South African expatriate rugby union players
Expatriate rugby union players in France
South African expatriate sportspeople in France
Rugby union players from the Western Cape